Minister of Development (Sar HaPituah) was a portfolio in the Israeli cabinet between 1953 and 1974. The ministry was responsible for government-owned mineral extraction companies and the country's geology institute. The department also set up both the quarry rehabilitation fund and the Dead Sea Works.

The post was scrapped in 1974, and succeeded three years later by the Energy and Infrastructure portfolio. Since 2005 there has also been a Minister for the Development of the Negev and Galilee.

List of ministers

Deputy ministers

Lists of government ministers of Israel